Berryessa  is a district of San Jose, California, located in North San Jose.  The district is named after the Berryessa family, a prominent Californio family of the Bay Area which historically owned most of the area.

History

In the late 19th century, Berryessa was a small farming community, well-known across California for its high-quality fruit. Hostetter Road, Capitol Avenue, Piedmont Road, and Lundy Avenue were formerly surrounded by apricot and prune orchards. The J. F. Flickinger Fruit Packing Company, one of the largest fruit packing companies in the Santa Clara Valley, was located around present-day Hostetter Road. In the 1960s and 70s, the land where the orchards stood was developed into suburban residential neighborhoods and businesses. Today, tiny remnants of the orchards remain, including the Orlando Farm. In 2013 it, too, was developed into housing on Capitol Avenue and the Mattos' apricot orchard off Piedmont Road.

Today, Berryessa is distinguished as a fast-growing bedroom community of San Jose. It is served by VTA light rail and (in 2019), an extension of the Bay Area Rapid Transit BART system.

The old Berryessa Elementary School building, built in 1927, is a Spanish Colonial Revival style, designed by noted Northern California architect W.H. Weeks. The building has served as a commercial space since 1983.

Geography

The district borders Milpitas along Landess Avenue to the north and the Alum Rock neighborhood of East San Jose along Mabury Road to the south. 

The residential neighborhood is part of the Fourth City Council District, along with Alviso. It was represented by Chuck Reed, prior to his election as Mayor of San Jose. The current district representative is David Cohen.

Parks
Berryessa Creek Park
Penitencia Creek Park
Alum Rock Park
Boccardo Look Trail
Cataldi Park

Community

San Jose Public Library operates the Berryessa Branch Library and the Educational Park Branch Library.

Berryessa is home to the long-established San Jose Flea Market.

Berryessa Art & Wine Festival
The annual Berryessa Art & Wine Festival, one of the best-known local events in the area, has been a tradition for over 40 years. 

The festival is typically held in May. It includes 120-150 artist booths and 14 food booths, run by Berryessa non-profit groups. Community Row features booths from various service groups and non-profits that offer information to the festival-goers. Business Row has representatives from the Berryessa community and other local San Jose businesses. A stage area features local amateur and professional entertainment, and there are booths from several local radio stations. 

The festival is held on the grounds of Penitencia Creek Park.

Transportation

Berryessa is well-served by two regional transit systems: VTA light rail and BART.

VTA light rail:
Berryessa (VTA)
Cropley (VTA)
Hostetter (VTA)
Penitencia Creek (VTA)

 BART:
Berryessa/North San Jose station

Education

Berryessa Union School District operates public schools. Saint Victor Catholic School and Milpitas Christian School (founded in Milpitas but now located in Berryessa) are the only private schools in the area.

Public schools in Berryessa include:

High schools
 Independence High School
 Piedmont Hills High School

Middle schools
 Morrill Middle School
 Piedmont Middle School
 Sierramont Middle School

Elementary schools
 Brooktree Elementary School
 Cherrywood Elementary School
 Laneview Elementary School
 Majestic Way Elementary School
 Noble Elementary School
 Northwood Elementary School
 Ruskin Elementary School
 Summerdale Elementary School
 Toyon Elementary School
 Vinci Park Elementary School

Gallery

Notable residents
The following people either grew up in Berryessa or are current residents of the area:
 Rex Walters - former NBA player and Head Basketball Coach at USF
 Chris Manak, aka Peanut Butter Wolf - DJ and Music Producer
 Chuck Reed - former Mayor of San Jose
 Jerry Yang - internet entrepreneur, and venture capitalist, co-founder of Yahoo!

References

External links

 Berryessa Citizens Advisory Council
 City of San Jose, Council District 4
 Berryessa branch of San Jose Public Library system

Neighborhoods in San Jose, California